Glen Charles Cook (born July 9, 1944) is an American writer  of fantasy and science fiction, known for The Black Company and Garrett P.I. fantasy series.

Biography
Cook was born in New York City. Cook served in the United States Navy from 1962 to 1972 and specifically was attached, for a time, to a Marine Force Recon unit, the 3rd Marine Battalion. During his time attached to the Force Recon Unit, Cook participated in what he called "practice combat", and left active duty, "a month before [the unit] shipped out to Viet Nam". He later worked his way through college. Cook began to write in earnest while working for General Motors at an auto assembly plant in a job which was "hard to learn, but [involved] almost no mental effort", writing as many as three books per year.

Cook wrote The Black Company, a novel published by Tor Fantasy, in May 1984. It began a gritty fantasy series of the same name (or Chronicles of the Black Company) following an elite mercenary unit through several decades of its history. As of 2016, it comprises the novels published in three subseries 1984–85, 1989–90, and 1996–2000, plus recent short fiction. It has become something of a cult classic, especially among current and former members of the military. When asked about the series' popularity among soldiers, Cook replied: "The characters act like the guys actually behave. It doesn't glorify war; it's just people getting on with the job. The characters are real soldiers. They're not soldiers as imagined by people who've never been in the service. That's why service guys like it." Cook is also known for his Garrett P.I. series, which tells the haphazard adventures of hardboiled detective Garrett, and for his Dread Empire series.

List of works

References

External links

 
 
 Novel synopses, cover art, and reviews at Fantasy Literature

1944 births
20th-century American male writers
20th-century American novelists
20th-century American short story writers
21st-century American male writers
21st-century American novelists
21st-century American short story writers
American fantasy writers
American male novelists
American male short story writers
Living people
United States Navy sailors